City physician (from Latin ) was a historical title in the Late Middle Ages for a physician appointed by the city council. The city physician was responsible for the health of the population, particularly the poor, and the sanitary conditions in the city. His duties also included the supervision of pharmacies and the supervision of those engaged in medical tasks, such as midwives and barber surgeons. In addition, he had forensic duties such as assessing the injuries of living persons, external postmortem examinations, and conducting autopsies in cases of non-natural and unexplained deaths. In times of epidemic, many city physicians published small, printed books of guidelines.

The role existed in what are today a number of European countries, including Germany, Estonia, Finland, Norway, Poland, Sweden, and Switzerland.

Holy Roman Empire and German Confederation 
The designation  was the title for the civil servant physician in Prussia until 1901.

Well-known early city physicians include Hugh of Lucca, who was appointed surgeon in Bologna, Italy, in 1214, and William of Saliceto, who was appointed city physician in Verona, Italy in 1275. Other cities in the Empire established physician positions in the 13th and 14th centuries. Later, per the 1426 decree of Emperor Sigismund, all cities in the Holy Roman Empire were required to hire a city physician.

In the late 16th and early 17th centuries, the preparation of calendars with astrological weather forecasts was also often performed by city physicians.

Some city physicians also acted as personal physicians to noble or ecclesiastical dignitaries.

In less densely populated regions, the office was combined as city and district physician, who had to care for or supervise a specific medical district in addition to the city.

The deputy of the city physician was called , e.g. in Hamburg.

Sweden 
In Sweden, city physicians (formerly ) were responsible for the duties in cities which in rural areas belonged to provincial physicians.

In 1669, a city surgeon (city barber) was hired to work alongside the city physician in Stockholm, to assist in the treatment of external diseases and accidents. By royal decree in 1827, both posts were transformed into those of city physician (first and second city physician). In 1757, the first city district doctors in Stockholm (three in number) were employed to provide medical care for the city's ailing poor.

In Stockholm, Gothenburg and Malmö, the chief city physician or city physician was equal to the chief provincial physician in the counties, with almost the same duties as the latter. City doctors were appointed by the city council, after the Medical Board had given an opinion on the competence of the respective applicants and the city's health board had been given the opportunity to give its opinion on the matter.

City district physicians, that is to say, persons who exercised the function of city physicians only within a certain district of the city, were appointed in the same order by the city council, unless the administration of the public health service was entrusted to the board of health, in which case the appointment of these physicians could also be entrusted to the same board.

In Stockholm, the role of city physician was established in 1827 and lasted until 1971.

Finland 
The position of city physician (later ) existed in Finland during the Swedish era and for a time after the country declared independence. Turku was the first city to hire a city physician, in 1755, and Helsinki was the second in 1774.

Norway 
In Norway, Bergen was the first city to have a city physician ( or), appointed in 1603. Oslo's city physician role existed from 1626 until it was abolished in 1988; its city physician also held the role of head of the city's health council. In Trondheim, the post was created in 1661, with Jens Nicolaisen as its first doctor.

City physicians 

William of Saliceto (after 1210 – ), Lombard surgeon, professor in Bologna and city physician in Verona from 1275
Hugh of Lucca (–1259), city surgeon and court physician in Bologna
Konrad Müntzmeister (14th–15th century), city physician in Straßburg
Heinrich Steinhöwel (1410–1411 – 1479), city physician in Ulm
  ( – after 1518), German wound surgeon and leading surgeon of the Late Middle Ages
Johann Stocker (1453–1513), city physician in Ulm
Theophrastus Bombastus von Hohenheim, called Paracelsus (1493–1541), city physician in Basel
Georgius Agricola (1494–1555), city physician in Chemnitz
 ( – 1585), city physician in Coburg
 ( – 1588), Transylvanian city physician in Brașov
 (died 1594), city physician in Bad Neustadt an der Saale, director of the Würzburg Juliusspital
Conrad Gessner (1516–1565), chief city physician in Zurich
 (1520–1577), city physician in Colmar and Bern
 (1525–1588), city physician in Bremen
 (1526–1569), city physician in Aachen
 (1530–1606), city physician in Frankfurt am Main
 (1531–1587), city physician in Lübeck
 (1533–1603), city physician in Naumburg/Saale
Zacharias Stopius ( 1535late 16th or early 17th century), city physician in Riga
Felix Platter (1536–1614), city physician in Basel
 (1537–1596), city physician in Arnstadt and personal physician to the Counts of Schwarzburg
 (1542–1583), city physician in Nordhausen
 Wilhelm Fabry (1560–1634), wound surgeon, city physician in Bern and founder of scientific surgery
 ( – 1621), city physician in Augsburg
Martin Ruland the Younger (1569–1611), city physician in Regensburg
 (1583–1632), city physician in Ulm, Schorndorf and Augsburg
 (1590–1668), city physician in Frankenhausen, Altenburg and Wrocław
 (1592–1671), city physician in Römhild and Coburg
 (1595–1645), city physician in Ulm
 (1595 – ), city physician in Coburg and Kitzingen
 (1605–1665), city physician in Altorf
  (1608–1642), city physician in Darmstadt and Babenhausen
Philipp Jakob Sachs (1627–1672), city physician in Wrocław
  (1647–1724), city physician in Hildesheim
 (1651–1702), city physician in Sondershausen, Weißensee and personal physician to the prince of Schwarzburg-Sondershausen
 (1662–1712), city physician in Nordhausen
 (1664–1742) and his son  (1696–1773), city physicians in Świdnica
  (1672–1712), city physician in Anklam and Greifswald
 (1673–1746), city physician in Darmstadt
 (1681–1751), city physician in Eisenach
 (1683–1738) and son  (1718–1756), city physicians in Tallinn
 (1686–1757), city physician in Elbląg
 (1696–1773), city physician in Altona, Hamburg
 (1699–1759), city physician in Hamburg
 (1704–1776), city physician in Neuruppin
  (1709–1746), city and district physician in Heidelberg, personal physician to the prince-bishop of Speyer
 (1714–1778), city physician in Deggendorf
  (1718–1796), city physician in Hamburg
 (1718–1796), deputy city physician in Hamburg
Johann Friedrich Struensee (1737–1772), city physician in Altona, later minister in Copenhagen
Friedrich von Wendt (1738–1818), city physician in Pszczyna
Ernst Ludwig Heim (1747–1834), city physician in Spandau
 (1749–1804), city physician in Bremen
 (1756–1842), city physician and pharmacist in Kuressaare
 (1765–1827), city physician in Dresden
Wilhelm Daniel Joseph Koch (1771–1849), city physician in Trarbach
Johann Christian August Clarus (1774–1854), city physician in Leipzig
Dietrich Georg von Kieser (1779–1862), city and county physician in Northeim
 Karl Ernst Büchner (1786–1861), city physician in Darmstadt
  (1788–1863), physician of the city and county (Amt) Rendsburg
 Frederik Holst (1791–1871), city physician in Christiania (Oslo)
Georg Carl  (1793–1835), city physician in Tallinn
Friedrich Reinhold Kreutzwald (1803–1882), city physician in Võru
  (1837–1890), city physician in Wrocław
  (1838–1890), city physician in Lübeck
 Juhan Luiga (1873–1927), city physician in Tallinn

See also 

 Archiater
 Barber surgeon
 Plague doctor

References

Further reading 

 
 
 
 

Physicians
History of medicine
Medieval occupations
Traditional healthcare occupations
Professional titles and certifications